James Corbett, MBE (17 July 1908 – 3 March 2005) was an Australian politician. Born in Temora, New South Wales, he was educated at both state and Catholic schools. He was a farmer, grazier and Murilla Shire Councillor before entering federal politics. In 1966, he was elected to the Australian House of Representatives as the Country Party member for the Queensland seat of Maranoa. He held the seat until his retirement in 1980. Corbett died in 2005.

References

1908 births
2005 deaths
National Party of Australia members of the Parliament of Australia
Members of the Australian House of Representatives for Maranoa
Members of the Australian House of Representatives
Australian Members of the Order of the British Empire
20th-century Australian politicians